= Istanbul Technical University Faculty of Textile Technologies and Design =

Textile school

ITU Faculty of Textile Technologies and Design
- Type: Public school
- Established: 1955 as a program
- Dean: Prof. Dr. Nevin Çiğdem Gürsoy
- Location: Istanbul, Turkey
- Campus: Urban
- Website: www.tekstil.itu.edu.tr/en/

ITU Faculty of Textile Technologies and Design is one of the ITU faculties in Gümüşsuyu campus. It is the first and the single one offering textile engineering education in Istanbul, and also comes first among the top textile engineering schools in Turkey. Its history could be traced back to 1955. There are three undergraduate programs under Textile Engineering Department:

- Textile Engineering Program
- Fashion and Design Program
- Textile Development and Marketing Program

ITU Faculty of Textile Technologies and Design is a member of Association of Universities for Textiles (AUTEX)
